Capitola may refer to:

Capitola, California
Capitola, Florida